Adult Jazz is an English experimental rock band from Leeds, United Kingdom.

History
Adult Jazz was established in 2010 at the University of Leeds. Members Tim Slater, Harry Burgess and Steven Wells are all originally from Guildford. In 2013, they released a 12" vinyl single; In 2014 the band released their debut full-length album titled Gist Is on Spare Thought.

In 2016, Adult Jazz released a mini-album titled Earrings Off! on Tri Angle.

Discography
Studio albums
Gist Is (2014, Spare Thought)
Earrings Off! (2016, Tri Angle)

EPs
Am Gone/Springful (2014, Spare Thought)

References

External links
Official Bandcamp

English experimental musical groups
English rock music groups
Musical groups established in 2010
2010 establishments in England